This is an incomplete list of ghost towns in New York.

Conklingville (evacuated and used to dam the Great Sacandaga Lake)
Delta (submerged into the Delta Reservoir)
Doodletown
Elko (Quaker Bridge)
Love Canal
Kensico, New York (submerged into the Kensico Reservoir)
New Ireland
Onoville (see Kinzua Dam)
Oswego, New York (hamlet), not to be confused with the city of Oswego, New York
Parksville
Red House (see Allegany State Park)
Tahawus

References

New York
Ghost towns